Universidad Nuestra Señora de La Paz (English: Our Lady of La Paz University), founded on April 24, 1992, is a private nonprofit university located in La Paz, Bolivia. It is one of the oldest private universities in Bolivia.

Universities in Bolivia
La Paz